Reid Hall (1948–2006) was a dormitory at Miami University in Oxford, Ohio that housed about 140 students. However, it was not just a place where students lived. After a shooting occurred in 1959, the building became known as one of the most haunted buildings on campus. It was torn down in order to make room for the Farmer School of Business, but has been recreated within a set of buildings called Heritage Commons.

History

Whitelaw Reid

Reid Hall was named after Whitelaw Reid, a former Miami student from the class of 1856. Whitelaw later became a diplomat and a journalist. He also ran as vice-president of the United States with Benjamin Harrison in 1892. He died on December 15, 1912 and remained a loyal Miami Alumnus throughout his life.

A Murder
On May 9, 1959, two men began fighting within Reid Hall. The Resident Advisor, Roger Sayles, tried to stop the fight, but was accidentally shot in the process. The shooter then ran to Ogden Hall and took his own life just moments after the first death. Legend states that after Sayles was shot, he reached for a door leaving behind a bloody hand print. (Stories vary as to whether it was two hand prints or just one). Many students claimed that the hand prints refused to fade and were still visible on the wood. Other students claimed to hear men arguing loudly, but when they went to find the source of the arguers, no one was ever found....

Other Events
On Easter Weekend in 1987, Reid Hall caught fire which led to $500,000 worth of damage 

As of December 10, 2004, Miami University announced that Reid Hall would be torn down in order to make room for the creation of a new building. According to an article in the Miami Student, Reid Hall destruction was suggested by current Miami President, James C. Garland. In response to this news, 607 people signed a petition led by 2004 Miami Grad, Katie Goodhew, in an attempt to save the beloved hall from destruction. The petition was passed along through the web with outlets such as e-mail and networking. Goodhew got the word out through a blanket e-mail to friends, the Residence Hall Association, National Residence Hall Honorary and current student leaders at Reid Hall. According to the article, only 50% of the petition signers actually lived in Reid Hall. Goodhew explained that it was because many students were upset to see the famous hall torn down. This article was written April 26, 2005. However, the board did not find the petition convincing and decided to build the Farmer School of Business in its place.

Present Existence
Reid Hall was torn down in order to make room for the new Farmer School of Business in 2005. President Jim Garland's recommendation of using Reid Hall's location was accepted by the board and construction ensued. Within that same year, a “new” Reid Hall was built within Heritage Commons. The new hall is “one of six apartment-style living accommodations” that is available for upper class and graduate students.

References

Buildings and structures of Miami University
Buildings and structures demolished in 2006
Demolished buildings and structures in Ohio